Asif Muhammad Khan (born 8 February 1961) is an Indian politician and was member of the Fourth and Fifth Legislative Assemblies of Delhi, India. He represented the Okhla constituency and is a member of the Indian National Congress.

Career
Khan contested and won his first election in 1997 from the Okhla ward of Municipal Corporation of Delhi as an independent candidate. He won the election into the Municipal Council for a second term and remained a councillor till 2007. Khan then contested the 2008 Delhi Legislative Assembly Election from a Rashtriya Janta Dal ticket from Okhla but lost to Parvez Hashmi by only 541 votes. After Hashmi was nominated to the Rajya Sabha, Khan contested the 2009 by-election and became a member of the assembly. He later switched to the Indian National Congress in 2013. He went on to win the seat for a second time in the 2013 Assembly Election. Khan lost the 2015 Delhi Legislative Assembly Election and came third.

References

Delhi MLAs 2008–2013
Delhi MLAs 2013–2015
Living people
Rashtriya Janata Dal politicians
Indian National Congress politicians
1961 births